The 1972–73 Maltese First Division was the 58th season of top-tier football in Malta.  It was contested by 10 teams, and Floriana F.C. won the championship.

League standings

Second Place tie-breaker
With both Sliema Wanderers and Hamrun Spartans level on 25 points, a play-off match was conducted to qualification for the UEFA Cup

Results

External links
Malta - List of final tables (RSSSF)

Maltese Premier League seasons
Malta
Premier